The Tzanichitai, singular Tzanichites and feminine form Tzanichitissa, was one of the most important noble families of the late Empire of Trebizond.

History
The family hailed from the castle and namesake region of Tzanicha, near modern Torul in Turkey. Modern scholars such as Anthony Bryer and Alexios Savvides have linked the family to the Zans ( in Greek), a local tribe related to the Georgians. In the civil wars that tore the Empire of Trebizond in the middle of the 14th century, the Tzanichites family sided with the pro-Byzantine faction under the Scholarioi. After the civil wars ended, the Kabazites family may have replaced the Tzanichitai as hereditary governors of the province of Chaldia.   The family continues to be attested after the Fall of Trebizond to the Ottoman Empire: Ottoman tax registers contain references to its members up to 1515.

Known members
 Theodore Tzanichites (Θεόδωρος Τζανιχίτης), landowner, attested in an inscription dated to 1305/6 (but as early as 1203/4 or 1210/11 by some earlier scholars).
 Irene Tzanichitissa (spelled Ἐρήνη Τζανηχήτησα), landowner, in the same inscription as Theodore Tzanichites.
 John Tzanichites (Ἰωάννης Τζανιχίτης),  of the court in 1330–1355. In 1352 he briefly seized the castle of Tzanicha against Emperor Alexios III of Trebizond.
 Sebastos Tzanichites (Σεβαστός Τζανιχίτης), participated in a failed uprising against Empress Irene Palaiologina in summer 1340, banished to Limnia and executed in June 1341.
 Michael Tzanichites (Μιχαήλ Τζανιχίτης), killed in a naval battle against the Genoese off Caffa.
 Constantine Tzanichites (Κωνσταντῖνος Τζανιχίτης), governor of Palaiomatzouka in 1415.Likely the same person as the previous. 
 [NA] Tzanichites (Τζανιχίτης), landowner in Trebizond in 1433.

Castle 
Bryer states that at Tzanicha (Canca) exists the remains of an old castle and two chapels. The castle is located on an elongated expanse of land 2 km northwest of modern Gümüşhane, and 400m above the south bank of the Kanis (Harsit) river. Both chapels contain paintings or inscriptions of Christian figures of the church.

References

Sources

Further reading
 

People of the Empire of Trebizond
Byzantine families